The 15th Asian Athletics Championships were held in Manila, Philippines on September 20–23, 2003.

Results

Men

Women

Medal table

Participating nations

See also
2003 in athletics (track and field)

External links
Medalists
Full results
Partial results

 
Asian Athletics Championships
Asian Championships
International athletics competitions hosted by the Philippines
Asian Championships in Athletics
Sports in Manila
Athletics Championships
Asian Athletics Championships